Richard or Rich Houston may refer to:

 Richard Houston (1721?–1775), Irish engraver
 Richard Houston (cricketer) (1863–1921), Australian cricketer
 Rich Houston (1945–1982), American football player